The Long Strait (Proliv Longa) is a body of water in the Russian Federation.

History
This strait was named after the American whaling captain Thomas W. Long.

In August 1983, it was the site of a disaster when 50 ships were trapped in ice, with the loss of one and damage to as many as 30 others.

Geography
This strait separates Wrangel Island from the Siberian mainland.  It is very broad, its minimum width being 141 km, between Cape Blossom at the southwestern tip of Wrangel Island and Cape Yakan, 65 km east of Cape Billings, close to Gytkhelen, Chukotka. 

The Long Strait is also a geographic landmark connecting the East Siberian Sea and the Chukchi Sea.

References

External links
 Geographical names

Straits of Russia
Bodies of water of the Chukchi Sea
Straits of the East Siberian Sea
Bodies of water of Chukotka Autonomous Okrug